Chan Sae-Lim (born 1933) is a Thai basketball player. He competed in the men's tournament at the 1956 Summer Olympics.

References

1933 births
Living people
Chan Sae-Lim
Chan Sae-Lim
Basketball players at the 1956 Summer Olympics
Place of birth missing (living people)